Dillon Matthew Boucher  (born 27 December 1975) is a New Zealand former professional basketball player. His 13 combined career championships is the most in ANBL/NZNBL history.

Early life
Growing up in Bell Block, a small township just outside of New Plymouth, Boucher picked up basketball in his final year at Bell Block Primary School, thanks in large part to his older brothers. Boucher continued to play the sport through high school, spending his third-form year at New Plymouth's Spotswood College in 1989 before relocating to Auckland in 1990 and attending Papatoetoe High School. While he enjoyed playing basketball, it was when he was selected for his first New Zealand age-group squad, around the age of 17, he saw the potential to make a career out of it.

Professional career
Boucher played for the New Zealand Breakers in the Australian National Basketball League from their inception in 2003 until 2005 when he signed with the Perth Wildcats for whom he played for in 2005/06. Boucher then played for the Brisbane Bullets between 2006 and 2008. In 2008, he re-joined the New Zealand Breakers and was part of the team's championship three-peat between 2010/11 and 2012/13. Boucher retired from the Breakers and the Australian NBL in 2013. The Breakers retired his number 24.

With the Auckland Pirates in 2012, Boucher won his ninth NZNBL championship. Prior to 2011, he played for the Auckland Stars, Waikato Titans and Harbour Heat. He played for the Wellington Saints in 2013, before joining the Super City Rangers in 2014. He was player/assistant with the Rangers in 2015. In November 2015, he re-signed with the Rangers on a three-year deal, continuing on as a player/assistant coach. On 4 May 2017, Boucher became the second player to reach 400 NBL games, joining Phill Jones (406). On 5 June 2017, he played his 409th career NBL game, surpassing Jones as the all-time leader.

On 12 July 2018, Boucher announced that the 2018 season would be his last in the New Zealand NBL. He finished his career with 426 NBL games.

Off the court
In 2016, Boucher became the New Zealand Breakers' general manager. In September 2019, he quit as general manager of the Breakers.

In November 2020, Boucher was appointed Director of Basketball for the Auckland Huskies in the New Zealand NBL.

In September 2021, Boucher was appointed CEO of Basketball New Zealand.

National team career
Boucher made his first Tall Blacks team in 2001. He was part of the squad who shocked the hoops world to claim fourth place at the 2002 FIBA World Championship. Following his national team call up, Boucher became a fixture in the side until his retirement from the international level in 2008.

Personal
In the 2014 Queen's Birthday Honours, Boucher was appointed a Member of the New Zealand Order of Merit for services to basketball.

References

External links
Dillon Boucher at nzbreakers.co.nz
Dillon Boucher at fiba.basketball
Dillon Boucher at sportstg.com

1975 births
Living people
Auckland Pirates players
Auckland Stars players
Basketball players at the 2006 Commonwealth Games
Brisbane Bullets players
Commonwealth Games medallists in basketball
Commonwealth Games silver medallists for New Zealand
Harbour Heat players
Members of the New Zealand Order of Merit
New Zealand Breakers players
New Zealand expatriate basketball people in Australia
New Zealand men's basketball players
Perth Wildcats players
Power forwards (basketball)
Small forwards
Sportspeople from New Plymouth
Super City Rangers players
Waikato Titans players
Wellington Saints players
2006 FIBA World Championship players
2002 FIBA World Championship players
People educated at Papatoetoe High School
Medallists at the 2006 Commonwealth Games